Amedeo Nazzari (10 December 1907 in Cagliari – 5 November 1979 in Rome) was an Italian actor. Nazzari was one of the leading figures of Italian classic cinema, often considered a local variant of the Australian–American star Errol Flynn. Although he emerged as a star during the Fascist era, Nazzari's popularity continued well into the post-war years.

Early career
Amedeo Nazzari was born as Amedeo Carlo Leone Buffa in Cagliari, Sardinia, in 1907 and he later adopted as his professional name the name of his maternal grandfather, Amedeo Nazzari, a magistrate who had been the president of the Court of Appeal of Vicenza in Veneto and later took the same position in Cagliari. Although Amedeo eventually moved to Rome, he always retained a slight trace of his native Sardinian accent. While Nazzari was keen on gaining film contracts much of his early experience was in the theatre. He entered a contest organised by Twentieth Century Fox to find an Italian actor to fill the boots of the recently deceased screen star Rudolph Valentino, but lost out to Alberto Rabagliati. He was rejected after screen tests by Italian professionals, who found him too tall, thin and thought he had a too gloomy expression.

Nazzari made his debut in Ginevra degli Almieri (1935), following a recommendation from Elsa Merlini. His first read role came with the 1936 film Cavalry, and he followed it up with The Castiglioni Brothers (1937). His breakthrough came with the 1938 film Luciano Serra, Pilot (1938) where he played a First World War veteran who returns to fight for Italy during the Abyssinian War. Nazzari was transformed into a matinee idol, the most bankable star of Italian cinema. Following the film, Nazzari was invited to join the Fascist Party by Benito Mussolini, but declined saying "Thank You Duce! I would prefer not to concern myself with politics, occupied as I am with more pressing artistic commitments".

Stardom

Despite declining to join the Fascist party, Nazzari, along with a handful of other actors such as Fosco Giachetti, was considered one of exemplary male heroes. Most of his film roles from this point present him as a masculine (often military) figure. His emergence as a star coincided with a major drive by the Italian government to rebuild the country's film industry which had declined since its heyday in the silent era.

This policy involved large-scale government funding of films and the construction of the massive Cinecittà studio complex in Rome. The number of films produced each year climbed rapidly, with Nazzari a particularly prolific actor (making six films in 1939 and eight in 1941). During the era he worked with some of the leading Italian actresses including Alida Valli, Lilia Silvi, Luisa Ferida, Mariella Lotti, Assia Noris, Vera Carmi and Clara Calamai, often more than once.

Nazzari was almost always cast as a straightforward hero, and he closely protected his public persona to avoid any negative roles. An exception was the historical comedy-drama film The Jester's Supper (1942) in which he plays a loutish figure. Nazzari made four films with Alida Valli, including Unjustified Absence (1939).

Following Italy's entry into the Second World War in 1940, he combined romances and comedies, with occasional more propagandistic productions. Amongst the more political was Bengasi (1942), an anti-British war film set in Libya. Nazzari portrays an Italian patriot who masquerades as a collaborator with the British occupiers of Bengazi in order to steal their battle plans. It was the only time he featured alongside the other great male star of the era, Fosco Giachetti.

Later career 

Star of Italian cinema during the 1940s and 1950s. He made several melodramas with Raffaello Matarazzo, such as Catene in 1949. Nazzari acted himself in Federico Fellini's Nights of Cabiria.

Awards
 David di Donatello Special David, for a life dedicated to cinema with passionate professionalism and extraordinary success.
 Nastro d'Argento Best Actor for Il bandito, 1947

Selected filmography

Cavalry (1936) as Umberto Solaro
Ginevra degli Almieri (1936) as Antonio Rondinelli
 Tomb of the Angels (1937) as Pietro
The Castiglioni Brothers (1937) as Fulvio Castiglioni
 The Count of Brechard (1938) as Francesco di Bréchard
Luciano Serra, Pilot (1938) as Luciano Serra
 (1938) as Gerardo di Jersay
The House of Shame (1938) as Giulio
 (1939) as Rocco Moretti
Unjustified Absence (1939) as Doctor Carlo Cristiani
 (1939) as Jack Morison / Inspector General Garner
 The Night of Tricks (1939) as Capatosta
 (1940) as Gianni / Hans
 One Hundred Thousand Dollars (1940) as Woods
 Beyond Love (1940) as Pietro Mirilli
 Then We'll Get a Divorce (1940) as Phil Gilder
 Big Shoes (1940) as Stefano Di Marco
 (1940) as Pietro Lanfranchi
 (1940) as Pietro Lanfranchi
Caravaggio (1941) as Michelangelo Merisi, the "Caravaggio"
 (1941) as Fabio Regoli
 Scampolo (1941) as Tito Sacchi
 (1941) as Bernardino Visconti
 (1941) as Franco Gádori
 The Last Dance (1941) as Professor Stefano Boronkay
 (1942) as Paolo Wronski
The Jester's Supper (1942) as Neri Chiaramontesi
Bengasi (1942) as Filippo Colleoni
Sleeping Beauty (1942) as Salvatore  "Sulfur black"
 Fedora (1942) as Loris Ipanov / Ivan Petrovic
 The Taming of the Shrew (1942) as Petruccio
 (1942) as Massimo Doriot
 Happy Days (1942) as Michele
 Men of the Mountain (1943) as Lieutenant Andrea Fontana
 Harlem (1943) as Amedeo Rossi
 (1943) as Amedeo Nazzari
 (1963)
 (1944) as Rodolfo Morigi
The Ten Commandments (1945) (segment —Thou shalt not covet thy neighbor's wife)
Un giorno nella vita (1946) as Captain De Palma
The Bandit (1946) as Ernesto
Malacarne (1946) as Zù Bastiano
 (1947) as Gaetano Donizetti
When the Angels Sleep (1947) as Blin
 (1947) as Renato Salesi
The Captain's Daughter (1947) as Pugaciov, Tsar Piotr III
Unexpected Conflict (1948) as Damian, the butler
 (1948)
 (1949) as Don Juan de Serrallonga
 (1949) as Vitaliano Lamberti
 (1949) as Count Carlo di Valfreda
The Wolf of the Sila (1949) as Rocco Barra
Marmolada (1950)
Torment (1950) as Carlo Guarnieri
Chains (1950) as Guglielmo Aniello
 The Merry Widower (1950) as Professor De Carlo
Alina (1950) as Giovanni
Barrier to the North (1950) as Major Mauri
 Women and Brigands (1950) as Michele Pezza  (Brother Devil)
Il Brigante Musolino (1950) as Beppe Musolino
 Brief Rapture (1951) as Francesco Leverrier, Police Inspector
Double Cross (1951) as Pietro Vanzetti
Last Meeting (1951) as Piero Castelli
Nobody's Children (1951) as Guido Canali
Volver a la vida (1951)
 (1952) as Franco Santinelli
We Are All Murderers (1952) as Doctor Detouche (Italian version)
Sensualità (1952) as Riccardo Sartori
Processo alla città (1952) as Prosecutor Antonio Spicacci
The Bandit of Tacca Del Lupo (1952) as Capt. Giordani
Altri tempi (1952) as Andrea Fabbri (segment )
The Flame (1952) as Colonel Felt
Who is Without Sin (1952) as Stefano Brunot
Il mondo le condanna (1953) as Paolo Martelli
Un marito per Anna Zaccheo (1953) as Doctor Illuminato
I Always Loved You (1953) as Massimo
Pietà per chi cade (1954) as Carlo Savelli
Torna! (1954) - Roberto Varesi
 (1954) as Jacques Barnaud
Appassionatamente (1954) as Andrea Morandi
Proibito (1954) as Costantino Corraine
The White Angel (1955) as Engineer Guido Carani
L'ultimo amante (1955) as Cesare Monti
The Intruder (1956) as Carlo Conti
Le notti di Cabiria (1957) as Alberto Lazzari
 (1957) as Michel de Caroli
Anna di Brooklyn (1958) as Ciccone
Il cielo brucia (1958) as Carlo Casati
Melancholic Autumn (1958) as Andrea, merchant captain
The Naked Maja (1958) as Prime Minister Manuel Godoy
Policarpo (1959) as The Carabiniere (uncredited)
World of Miracles (1959) as the presenter at the press conference
Labyrinth (1959) as Professor De Lattre
 (1959) as Coronel 
Il raccomandato di ferro (1959) as the State Secretary
Carthage in Flames (1959)
 (1960) as Salvatore Acierno
Journey Beneath the Desert (1961) as Tamal
Nefertiti, Queen of the Nile (1961) as Amenophis IV
The Best of Enemies (1961) as Maj. Fornari
The Corsican Brothers (1961) as Orlandi
 (1962)
 (1962) as Ruiz / André Leboeuf
 (1962) as General Hugo
Street of Temptation (1962) as Gentleman in a silk suit
The Shortest Day (1963) as Squinting soldier with abacus
Shivers in Summer (1964) as Count Marcello della Pietra
 (1964) as Max Branzeri
Il Gaucho (1964) as Marucchelli
 (1965) as Livio Bertana
 (1966) as François Derroux
The Poppy Is Also a Flower (1966) as Captain Di Nonno
Spy Today, Die Tomorrow (1967) as Bardo Baretti
The Column (1968) as Emperor Trajan
The Sicilian Clan (1969) as Tony Nicosia
The Valachi Papers (1972) as Gaetano Reina
A Matter of Time (1976) as Tewfik
Derrick (season 3,; 1976) as Dr. Pinaldi
 (1977) as Himself (final film role)

References

Bibliography
Amedeo Nazzari written by Piero Pruzzo and Enrico Lancia. Collana "Le stelle filanti", Gremese Editore, Roma, 1983.
Amedeo Nazzari. Il divo, l'uomo, l'attore by Simone Casavecchia, with an interview to Evelina Nazzari, Centro Sperimentale di Cinematografia (Roma, 2007) in the 100 Anniversary of the birth of the actor (1907/2007).  Sito ufficiale del C.S.C.
Amedeo Buffa in arte Nazzari written by Maria Evelina Buffa. Collana "Cinema italiano", Edizioni Sabinae, Roma, 2008.
Gundle, Stephen. Mussolini's Dream Factory: Film Stardom in Fascist Italy''. Berghahn Books, 2013.

External links

 
 

1907 births
1979 deaths
Italian male stage actors
Italian male film actors
People from Cagliari
Nastro d'Argento winners
20th-century Italian male actors
Italian male television actors
Burials at Campo Verano